Ernst Anton Jentsch (1867-1919) was a German psychiatrist. He authored works on psychology and pathology and is best known for his essay On the Psychology of the Uncanny (1906). However, he also authored texts on mood and the psychology of music. He is remembered for his influence on psychoanalyst Sigmund Freud who mentions the work of Jentsch in his essay "The Uncanny". Jentsch's work was also a great influence on the theory of the uncanny valley.

He died in 1919.

Works
 Musik und Nerven (2 volumes), 1904-1911
 Zur Psychologie des Unheimlichen, 1906
 Die Laune, 1912
 Das pathologische bei Otto Ludwig, 1913

Translations
 Studies of psychology of sex, by Havelock Ellis
 translated as Die krankhaften Geschlechtsempfindungen auf dissoziativer Grundlage, 1907
 Studien über Genie und Entartung, 1910, Original by Cesare Lombroso

References

German psychiatrists
1867 births
1919 deaths